Doris Mae Akers (May 21, 1923 – July 26, 1995) was a biracial African-American gospel music composer, arranger and singer who is considered to be "one of the most underrated gospel composers of the 20th century [who] wrote more than 500 songs". Known for her work with the Sky Pilot Choir, she was inducted into the Gospel Music Hall of Fame in 2001.

Biography

Early Years 

Doris Akers was born in Brookfield, Missouri to parents Floyd Akers (1887-1958) and Pearl M. Kelly (1896-1988). "Floyd and Pearl had married 21 June 1909 in Linn County, Missouri, an interracial marriage. They divorced some time after the birth of Bernice in 1926. When Pearl remarried to John Lawson (1892–1974) on 24 Feb. 1929, Doris and some of her siblings became part of that household, living in Kirksville, Adair County, Missouri, while three of her brothers stayed with their father." She had nine siblings: Edward, Floyd, Evelyn, Marian, Donald, Nellie, Bernice, Harley, and Charles. She learned to play the piano by ear at age six and wrote her first song, "Keep the Fire Burning in Me," when she was ten years old. During the 1930s she formed a group with her siblings, Edward, Marian and Donald, who went by the name of "Dot and The Swingsters".

Early career 
According to ASCAP documentation, in 1958, along with her friend Mahalia Jackson, Doris co-wrote the song, "Lord, Don't Move the Mountain", which sold over a million records. This composition also became a hit for another gospel superstar, Inez Andrews, over a decade later. 

While in Los Angeles, she became director of the Sky Pilot Choir, an integrated choir, which was also featured on recordings, television shows, and radio broadcasts across the country.   Her fresh, modern arrangements of traditional Negro spirituals drew large crowds from far and near and increased attendance at the church dramatically.  They released three albums, "The Sky Pilot Choir", "The Sky Pilot Choir Vol. 2" (with the Sutton Sisters), and "Doris Akers Sings with The Sky Pilot Choir".  Their organist on many occasions was a young Billy Preston.  She ended her collaboration with the Sky Pilot Choir in 1965, but they reunited again in 1974 to record their fourth effort, "Doris Akers and the Original Members of the Sky Pilot Choir". 
  
Akers continued recording for RCA Victor into the mid-sixties, cutting such albums as "Forever Faithful" (1963), a collaboration with The Statesmen Quartet entitled, "Sing for You" in 1964, and "Highway to Heaven". 

After having lived in Los Angeles since the mid-forties, she moved to Columbus, Ohio in 1970. On the "He Touched Me" track of her album "All God's Children" she recounts an incident of playing the song at the St. James Pentecostal Church in that city. She continued recording, composing and traveling. An album, "The Artistry of Doris Akers", was released in 1979.

Later career 
In the 1980s, Akers issued a new gospel album every year on a regional midwest label. Each album cover featured a new color photograph of the artist to let you know it was a current production. She also recorded a few albums in Canada which were not distributed in the United States, such as Crusade LP 2702 with Glad Tidings Temple's Harvest Time Choir. 

In the United States she began recording for the Gaither label and appeared at some of their concerts and in TV productions. In the early 1990s she was featured in Bill Gaither's gospel videos Old Friends, Turn Your Radio On, and Precious Memories.

She was affectionately known as "Miss Gospel Music" because she was admired and respected by everyone in the music industry over the years, she had mastered every aspect of gospel music including vocals, keyboards, choir directing, arranging, composing and publishing, she had worked with many of the pioneers of the Golden Age of Gospel Music, she had authored many standard gospel compositions, and she moved freely and successfully in all spheres of gospel music. Many of her compositions such as "Lead Me and Guide Me", "I Cannot Fail The Lord", "You Can't Beat God Giving", and "Sweet, Sweet Spirit", sold millions for other gospel artists and evangelists.  She was interviewed by Lindsay Terry for the book:  "Stories Behind 50 Southern Gospel Favorites" and she explained how the hit song "Sweet, Sweet Spirit" was revealed to her during a prayer session with one of her choirs before a church service.

Last years and death 
Akers lived out the final years of her life in Minneapolis, Minnesota, serving as Minister of Music at Grace Temple Deliverance Center. She discovered she had spinal cancer when she visited the doctor after breaking her ankle in August 1994. Akers died on July 26, 1995, in Edina, Minnesota. She was survived by two of her sisters, Nellie & Bernice, and her brother, Donald Akers.

Works

Collections 

 The Doris Akers Choral Series Vol. 1: Special Arrangements (1965)
 The Doris Akers Choral Series Vol. 2: Special Arrangements (1967) 
 The Doris Akers Choral Series Vol. 3: Special Arrangements   
 The Songs of Doris Akers for Voice and Piano with Guitar (1981) 
 Doris Akers Favorite Gospel Songs Vol. 1 (1965) 
 Doris Akers Favorite Gospel Songs Vol. 2 (1966) 
 Doris Akers Favorite Gospel Songs Vol. 3
 Doris Akers Favorite Gospel Songs Vol. 4

Breakdown of Published Collections

Legacy and honors 
Akers received many awards including back-to-back "Gospel Music Composer of the Year" in both 1960 and 1961. "Doris Akers Day" was held in Kirksville, Missouri in July, 1976. Akers was the headline act of the city's American Bicentennial celebration, with approximately 20,000 people attending an evening concert.

In 1992, Akers was honored by the Smithsonian Institution as "the foremost black gospel songwriter in the United States". She was posthumously inducted to the Gospel Music Hall of Fame in 2001. In 2011 Doris Akers was inducted into the Southern Gospel Music Hall of Fame.

References

Further reading

1923 births
1995 deaths
American gospel singers
20th-century African-American women singers
Deaths from cancer in Minnesota
Neurological disease deaths in Minnesota
Deaths from spinal cancer
People from Kirksville, Missouri
20th-century American singers
20th-century American composers
People from Brookfield, Missouri
20th-century American women singers
Southern gospel performers
20th-century women composers
American women hymnwriters
African-American songwriters